Stephen Fry is an English actor, comedian, author, and playwright.

He has received eleven British Academy Television Award nominations, eight for hosting the popular quiz show Q.I.. He is also nominated for his two documentary series Stephen Fry: The Secret Life of the Manic Depressive (2007), and Stephen Fry and the Gutenberg Press (2009). For his work in film he received a Golden Globe Award for Best Actor – Motion Picture Drama nomination for his performance as Oscar Wilde in the film Wilde (1998). He also received a Screen Actors Guild Award for Outstanding Performance by a Cast in a Motion Picture for Robert Altman's murder mystery Gosford Park (2001). For his work on the Broadway stage he received two Tony Award nominations. One for Best Book of a Musical for Me and My Gal in 1987 and another for Best Featured Actor in a Play for his performance as Malvolio in the revival of William Shakespeare's Twelfth Night in 2014.

Major associations

BAFTA Awards

Golden Globe Awards

Screen Actors Guild Awards

Tony Awards

Miscellaneous awards

British Comedy Awards 
 2007 - Best Entertainment Performance: Q.I. (nominated)
 2012 - Best Entertainment Performance: Q.I. (nominated)

British Independent Film Awards 
 2003 - Douglas Hilcox Award: Bright Young Things (nominated)

British LBGT Awards 
 2016 - Global Icon (received) 
 2019 - Lifetime Achievement (received)

Broadcast Film Critics Association 
2001 - Best Acting Ensemble - Gosford Park (won)

Emden International Film Festival 
2004 - Emden Film Award: Bright Young Things (nominated)

Florida Film Critics Circle 
2001 - Best Acting Ensemble - Gosford Park (won)

National Television Awards 
2010 - Special Recognition Award (winner)

Phoenix Film Critics Society 
2001 - Best Acting Ensemble - Gosford Park (nominated)

Satellite Awards 
1998 - Best Actor in a Motion Picture Drama - Wilde (nominated)
2001 - Best Acting Ensemble - Gosford Park (winner)

Seattle International Film Festival 
1998 - Best Actor - ''Wilde" (winner)

References 

Fry, Stephen